Herbert Jones may refer to:

Military
 Herbert M. Jones (1898–1990), U.S. Army Major General and Adjutant General
 Herbert C. Jones (1918–1941), U.S. Navy officer in Pearl Harbor; Medal of Honor recipient
 H. Jones (1940–1982), British Army officer in Falklands War; VC recipient

Religion
 Herbert Jones (bishop) (1861–1920), English clergyman, the second Suffragan Bishop of Lewes and Archdeacon of Chichester
 Herbert Gresford Jones (1870–1958), Anglican bishop, the third Suffragan Bishop of Warrington
 Herbert Jones (priest) (1887–1969), Dean of Manchester

Sports
 Herbert Jones (footballer, born 1896) (1896–1973), Blackburn Rovers and England footballer
 Herb Jones (footballer) (1915–1992), Australian rules footballer
 Herbert Jones (footballer, born 1929) (1929–2020), Welsh footballer who played for Wrexham
 Herbert Jones (jockey) (1880–1951), English jockey whose horse killed the women's suffrage campaigner Emily Davison
 Herbert Jones (racing driver) (1904–1926), American racing driver
 Herbert Jones (basketball) (born 1998), American men's basketball player

Other
 Herbert C. Jones (politician), California politician
 Herbert Ladd Jones (1858–1921), Canadian politician
 Herbie Jones (1926–2001), American jazz trumpeter and arranger

See also
Bert Jones (disambiguation)